The Nui Phao mine is a large open pit mine located in the northern part of Vietnam in Thái Nguyên Province. Nui Phao represents one of the largest tungsten reserves in Vietnam having estimated reserves of 55.4 million tonnes of ore grading 0.21% tungsten.

References 

Masan Resources

Tungsten mines in Vietnam